The Bethlehem Steel Corporation was an American steelmaking company headquartered in Bethlehem, Pennsylvania. For most of the 20th century, it was one of the world's largest steel producing and shipbuilding companies. At the height of its success and productivity, the company was a symbol of American manufacturing leadership in the world, and its decline and ultimate liquidation in the late 20th century is similarly cited as an example of America's diminished manufacturing leadership. From its founding in 1857 through its 2003 dissolution, Bethlehem Steel's headquarters and primary steel mill manufacturing facilities were based in Bethlehem, Pennsylvania in the Lehigh Valley region of the United States.

The company's steel was used in the construction of many of America's largest and most famed structures. Among major buildings, Bethlehem produced steel for 28 Liberty Street, the Chrysler Building, the Empire State Building, Madison Square Garden, Rockefeller Center, and the Waldorf Astoria hotel in New York City and Merchandise Mart in Chicago. Among major bridges, Bethlehem steel was used in constructing the George Washington Bridge and Verrazzano-Narrows Bridge in New York City, the Golden Gate Bridge in San Francisco, and the Peace Bridge between Buffalo and Fort Erie, Ontario.

Bethlehem Steel played an instrumental role in manufacturing U.S. warships and other military weapons used in World War I and later by the Allied forces in ultimately winning World War II. Over 1,100 Bethlehem Steel-manufactured warships were built for use in defeating Nazi Germany and the Axis powers in World War II. Historians cite Bethlehem Steel's ability to quickly manufacture warships and other military equipment as decisive factors in American victories in both world wars.

Bethlehem Steel's roots trace to an iron-making company organized in 1857 in Bethlehem, which was later named the Bethlehem Iron Company. In 1899, the owners of the iron company founded Bethlehem Steel Company and, five years later, Bethlehem Steel Corporation was created to be the steelmaking company's corporate parent.

Bethlehem Steel survived the earliest declines in American steel industry beginning in the 1970s. In 1982, however, the company suspended most of its steel making operations after posting a loss of $1.5 billion, attributable to increased foreign competition, rising labor and pensions costs, and other factors. The company declared bankruptcy in 2001 and final dissolution in 2003 when its remaining assets were sold to International Steel Group.

History

Establishment
In 1857, what ultimately became Bethlehem Steel, was launched as the Saucona Iron Company in Bethlehem, Pennsylvania by Augustus Wolle. That same year, the Panic of 1857, a national financial crisis, halted the company's further organization. But the organization subsequently restarted, its site was moved elsewhere to South Bethlehem, and the company's name was changed to the Bethlehem Rolling Mill and Iron Company. On June 14, 1860, the board of directors of the fledgling company elected Alfred Hunt president.

On May 1, 1861, the company's title was changed again, this time to the Bethlehem Iron Company. Construction of the first blast furnace began on July 1, 1861 was operationalized on January 4, 1863. The first rolling mill was built between the spring of 1861 and the summer of 1863 with the first railroad rails being rolled on September 26, 1863. A machine shop, in 1865, and another blast furnace, in 1867, were completed. During its early years, the company produced rails for the rapidly expanding railroads and armor plating used by the U.S. Navy.

Growth
The company continued to prosper during the early 1880s, but its share of the rail market began to decline in the face of competition from growing Pittsburgh and Scranton-based firms such as the Carnegie Steel Company and Lackawanna Steel. The nation's decision to rebuild the United States Navy with steam-driven, steel-hulled warships reshaped Bethlehem Iron Company's destiny.

Following the American Civil War, the U.S. Navy quickly downsized after the end of hostilities as national energies were redirected toward settling the West and rebuilding the war-ravaged South. Almost no new ordnance was produced, and new technology was neglected. By 1881, international incidents highlighted the poor condition of the U.S. fleet and the need to rebuild it to protect U.S. military capabilities, trade, and prestige.

In 1883, U.S. Secretary of the Navy William E. Chandler and U.S. Secretary of War Robert Todd Lincoln appointed Lt. William Jaques to the Gun Foundry Board and Jaques was sent on several fact-finding tours of European armament makers. On one of these trips, he formed business ties with the firm of Joseph Whitworth of Manchester, England. He returned to America as Whitworth's agent and, in 1885, was granted an extended furlough to pursue this personal interest.

Jaques was aware that the U.S. Navy would soon solicit bids for the production of heavy guns and other products such as armor that would be needed to further expand the fleet. Jaques contacted the Bethlehem Iron Company with a proposal to serve as an intermediary between it and the Whitworth Company, so Bethlehem Iron could erect a heavy-forging plant to produce ordnance. In 1885, John F. Fritz, sometimes referred to as the father of the U.S. Steel Industry, accompanied Bethlehem Iron directors Robert H. Sayre, Elisha Packer Wilbur (president of Lehigh Valley Railroad), William Thurston, and Joseph Wharton (founder of the Wharton School of the University of Pennsylvania) to meet with Jaques in Philadelphia. In early 1886, Bethlehem Iron and the Whitworth Company executed a contract.

In spring 1886, Congress passed a naval appropriations bill that authorized the construction of two armored second-class battleships, one protected cruiser, one first-class torpedo boat, and the complete rebuilding and modernization of two Civil War-era monitors. Bethlehem secured both the forging and armor contracts on June 28, 1887.

Between 1888 and 1892, the Bethlehem Iron Company completed the first U.S. heavy-forging plant. It was designed by John Fritz with the assistance of Russell Wheeler Davenport, who had joined Bethlehem Iron in 1888. By fall 1890, Bethlehem Iron was delivering gun forging to the U.S. Navy and was completing facilities to provide armor plating.

During the 1893 Chicago World's Fair, Bethlehem Steel provided the iron used in the creation of a 140-foot all-steel tower to support the world's first Ferris wheel, a  structure. The iron was manufactured in Bethlehem Steel's blast furnaces and represented the largest single piece of cast iron ever constructed at the time.

In 1898, Frederick Winslow Taylor joined Bethlehem Steel as a management consultant in order to solve an expensive machine shop capacity problem. Taylor and Maunsel White, with a team of assistants, applied a series of management principles established by Taylor, which would later come to be known as scientific management and was used in increasing mass production.

The Bethlehem Iron Company was very successful and profitable, and the corporate management of the Bethlehem Iron Company believed that it could be even more profitable. To accomplish that goal, the corporate ownership of the Bethlehem Iron Company switched to steel production, and the company's name was formally challenged to Bethlehem Steel Company.

Bethlehem Steel Company

Establishment and involvement with the Bethlehem Iron Company
In 1899, Bethlehem Steel Company was established. This was the first company to carry the name Bethlehem Steel. The Bethlehem Steel Company (also known as Bethlehem Steel Works) was incorporated to take over all liabilities of the Bethlehem Iron Company. The Bethlehem Iron Company and the Bethlehem Steel Company were separate companies under the same ownership. The Bethlehem Steel Company leased the properties that were owned by the Bethlehem Iron Company.

In 1901, Charles M. Schwab (no relation to the stockbroker Charles R. Schwab), purchased the Bethlehem Steel Company and made Samuel Broadbent its vice president. During this time, the company's lease with the Bethlehem Iron Company came to an end as the Bethlehem Steel Company gained control of all properties from the Bethlehem Iron Company and the Bethlehem Iron Company ceased operations.

Operating as a subsidiary of the United States Shipbuilding Company
Schwab transferred his ownership of the Bethlehem Steel Company to the United States Steel Corporation (U.S. Steel), the company he was president of. This period was brief; Schwab repurchased Bethlehem Steel Company, then sold it to the United States Shipbuilding Company. The United States Shipbuilding Company owned Bethlehem Steel Company only a brief time. The United States Shipbuilding Company was in turmoil; its subsidiaries, including the Bethlehem Steel Company, contributed to the United States Shipbuilding Company's problems. Schwab again became involved with Bethlehem Steel Company through the parent company, the United States Shipbuilding Company.

The United States Shipbuilding Company planned in 1903 to reorganize as the Bethlehem Steel and Shipbuilding Company, which would be the second company to use the name Bethlehem Steel. However, the United States Shipbuilding Company was not reorganized as the Bethlehem Steel and Shipbuilding Company; instead a plan was drawn up for a new company to be formed to replace the United States Shipbuilding Company. The new company was initially to be named Bethlehem Steel and Shipbuilding Company, but, in 1904, assumed instead the name Bethlehem Steel Corporation.

Bethlehem Steel Corporation

Establishment and early growth

The Bethlehem Steel Corporation was formed by Schwab, who had recently resigned from U.S. Steel, and by Joseph Wharton, who founded the Wharton School in Philadelphia. Schwab became the first president and first chairman of the board of directors.

After its formation, the Bethlehem Steel Corporation purchased the Bethlehem Steel Company and its remaining subsidiaries from the United States Shipbuilding Company. The Bethlehem Steel Company became a subsidiary of the Bethlehem Steel Corporation, though the Bethlehem Steel Company also had subsidiaries of its own. Bethlehem Steel Corporation became the second largest steel provider in the United States. Both the Bethlehem Steel Company and the Bethlehem Steel Corporation existed simultaneously after 1904 until the 1960s, when the two companies were merged into the Bethlehem Steel Corporation.

Bethlehem Steel Corporation installed the Gray rolling mill and produced the first wide-flange structural shapes to be made in America. These shapes were partly responsible for ushering in the age of the skyscraper and establishing Bethlehem Steel as the leading supplier of steel to the construction industry.

In the early 1900s, Samuel Broadbent led an initiative to diversify the company. The corporation branched out from steel, with iron mines in Cuba and shipyards around the country. In 1913, under Broadbent, Bethlehem Steel acquired the Fore River Shipbuilding Company of Quincy, Massachusetts, assuming the role of one of the world's major shipbuilders. In 1917, it incorporated its shipbuilding division as Bethlehem Shipbuilding Corporation Ltd. In 1922, Bethlehem Steel purchased the Lackawanna Steel Company, which included the Delaware, Lackawanna and Western Railroad and extensive coal holdings.

1930s and 1940s

During World War I and World War II, Bethlehem Steel was a major supplier of armor plate and ordnance to the U.S. armed forces, including armor plate and large-caliber guns for the U.S. Navy, and was influential to U.S. victories in both wars. Bethlehem Steel "was the most important to America's national defense of any company in the past century. We wouldn't have won World War I and World War II without it," historian Lance Metz told The Washington Post in 2003.

In the 1930s, the company also manufactured the steel sections and parts for the Golden Gate Bridge and built for Yacimientos Petrolíferos Fiscales (YPF), a new oil refinery in La Plata, Argentina, which was the tenth-largest in the world. During World War II, as much as 70 percent of airplane cylinder forgings, one-quarter of the armor plate for warships, and one-third of the big cannon forgings for the U.S armed forces were turned out by Bethlehem Steel.

Bethlehem Steel ranked seventh among United States corporations in the value of wartime production contracts. Bethlehem Shipbuilding Corporation's 15 shipyards produced a total of 1,121 ships, more than any other builder during the war and nearly one-fifth of the U.S. Navy's two-ocean fleet. Its shipbuilding operations employed as many as 180,000 persons, the lion's share of the company's total employment of 300,000.

Eugene Grace was president of Bethlehem Steel from 1916 to 1945, and chairman of the board from 1945 until his retirement in 1957. Grace orchestrated Bethlehem Steel's World War II wartime efforts. In 1943, he promised U.S. President Franklin D. Roosevelt that Bethlehem Steel would manufacture one ship per day, and he ultimately exceeded that commitment by 15 ships.

World War II, however, drained Bethlehem of much of its male workforce. The company hired female employees to guard and work on the factory floor and in the company offices. After the war, female workers were promptly fired in favor of male counterparts.

On Liberty Fleet Day, September 27, 1941, then U.S. President Roosevelt was present at the launching of the first Liberty ship SS Patrick Henry at Bethlehem's Bethlehem Fairfield Shipyard in Baltimore, Maryland.  Also launched that same day were the Liberty SS James McKay at Bethlehem Sparrows Point Shipyard in Sparrows Point, Maryland, and the emergency vessel SS Sinclair Superflame at the Fore River Shipyard in Quincy, Massachusetts.

In 1946, Bethlehem Steel signed a contract with mining company LKAB to contribute to the recovery of the post-World War II recovery of the iron ore industry in northern Sweden.

1950s and 1960s
Following the war's end, the Bethlehem Steel plant continued to supply a wide variety of structural shapes for the construction trades. Galvanized sheet steel under the name BETHCON was widely produced for use as duct work or spiral conduit.

Additionally, the company produced forged products for defense, power generation, and steel-producing companies.

From 1949 to 1952, Bethlehem Steel had a contract with the U.S. federal government to roll uranium fuel rods for nuclear reactors in Bethlehem Steel's Lackawanna, New York plant. Workers were not aware of the dangers of the hazardous substance and were not given protective equipment. Some workers have since attempted to receive compensation under a year 2000 radiation-exposure law. The law required the U.S. Labor Department to compensate workers up to $150,000 if they developed cancer later in life, provided their work history involved enough radiation exposure to significantly increase their cancer risk. The Bethlehem Steel workers have not been awarded this compensation because the radiation dose involved in processing fresh uranium fuel is low and produces a small risk relative to the baseline risk. The larger danger in processing uranium is chemical poisoning from the heavy metal, which does not produce cancer.)

The steel industry in the U.S. prospered during and after World War II, while the steel industries in Germany and Japan lay devastated by allied bombardments. Bethlehem Steel's success pinnacled in the 1950s as the company began manufacturing 23 million tons of steel annually. In 1958, the company's president, Arthur B. Homer, was the highest-paid U.S. business executive, and the firm built its largest plant between 1962 and 1964 in Burns Harbor, Indiana.

In 1967, the company lost its bid to provide the steel for the original World Trade Center. The contracts, a single one of which was for 50,000 tons of steel, went to competitors in Seattle, St. Louis, New York and Illinois.

1970s through 1990s

The U.S. global leadership in steel manufacturing lasted about two decades during which the U.S. steel industry operated with little foreign competition. But eventually, foreign firms were rebuilt with modern techniques such as continuous casting, while profitable U.S. companies resisted modernization. Bethlehem experimented with continuous casting but never fully adopted the practice.

Meanwhile, the age of Bethlehem Steel workers were increasing, and the ratio of retirees to workers was rising, meaning that the value created by each worker had to cover a greater portion of pension costs than before. Former top manager Eugene Grace had failed to adequately invest in the company's pension plans during the 1950s. When the company was at its peak, pension contributions that should have been made were not. As a result, the company encountered difficulty when it faced rising pension costs combined with diminishing profits and increased global competition.

By the 1970s, imported foreign steel was proving cheaper than domestically produced steel, and Bethlehem Steel faced growing competition from mini-mills and smaller-scale operations that could sell steel at lower prices.

In 1982, Bethlehem Steel reported a loss of US$1.5 billion and shut down much of its operations. The company's profitability returned briefly in 1988, but restructuring and shutdowns continued through the 1990s. In the mid-1980s, demand for the plant's structural products began to diminish and new competition entered the marketplace. Lighter construction styles, due in part to lower-height construction styles (i.e., low-rise buildings) did not require the heavy structural grades produced at the Bethlehem plant.

In 1991, Bethlehem Steel Corporation discontinued coal mining it had been conducting under the name BethEnergy and the company exited the railroad car business two years later, in 1993. In 1992, the Johnstown plants of the Bethlehem Steel, which had been founded in 1852 by The Cambria Iron Company of Johnstown and were purchased by Bethlehem Steel in 1923, were forced into closure.

By the end of 1995, Bethlehem Steel closed steel-making at its main Bethlehem plant. After roughly 140 years of metal production at in Bethlehem, Bethlehem Steel ceased its Bethlehem operations. Two years later, in 1997, Bethlehem Steel Corporation ceased shipbuilding activities in an attempt to preserve its steel-making operations. In 2001, however, Bethlehem Steel filed for bankruptcy and, in 2003, the company dissolved.

Closing and bankruptcy

In 1998, after denied pension benefits, a lawsuit was filed in the Third Circuit Court of Appeals in Philadelphia. The case, Lawrence Hollyfield, Fiduciary to the Estate of Collins Hollyfield v. Pension Plan of Bethlehem Steel Corporation and Subsidiary Companies, was settled in favor of Hollyfield in 2001. It led to a class action lawsuit filed by Bethlehem Steel's workers union soon thereafter. This settlement led to PBGC assuming all Bethlehem Steel pension obligations, representing the largest such pension liability assumption in U.S. history.

In 2001, Bethlehem Steel filed for bankruptcy. It became the 25th American steelmaking company in the span of four years (1998-2001) to file for bankruptcy protection. In 2003, the company was dissolved with its remaining assets, including six plants, acquired by the International Steel Group. International Steel Group, in turn, was acquired by Mittal Steel in 2005, which then merged with Arcelor to become ArcelorMittal in 2006.

Despite closing its local operations, Bethlehem Steel tried to reduce the significant economic and social impact on Bethlehem and the Lehigh Valley area, announcing plans to revitalize the south side of Bethlehem where its headquarters and primary plant had existed since the mid-19th century. The company hired consultants to develop conceptual plans on the reuse of the massive property, and a consensus emerged to rename the  site Bethlehem Works and to use the land for cultural, recreational, educational, entertainment, and retail development.

In 2007, the Bethlehem Steel property was sold to Sands BethWorks with plans to build a casino where the plant once stood. Construction began in fall 2007, and the casino was completed in 2009. Ironically, due to a global steel shortage at the time, the casino had difficulty finding the 16,000 tons of structural steel needed for construction of the $600 million casino complex.

The site of the company's original plant in Bethlehem, Pennsylvania is home to SteelStacks, an arts and entertainment district. The plant's rusted five blast furnaces were left standing and serve as a backdrop for the new campus. SteelStacks currently features the ArtsQuest Center, a contemporary performing arts center, the Wind Creek Bethlehem casino resort (formerly Sands Casino Resort Bethlehem), a gambling emporium, and new studios for WLVT-TV, the Lehigh Valley's PBS affiliate. The area includes three outdoor music venues: Levitt Pavilion is a free music venue featuring lawn seating for up to 2,500 people; Air Products Town Square at Steelstacks; and PNC Plaza, which hosts concerts. Levitt Pavilion and the casino resort are connected via the Hoover-Mason Trestle linear park.

On November 9, 2016, a warehouse being used as a recycling facility that was part of the Bethlehem Steel complex in Lackawanna, New York caught fire and burned down.

On May 19, 2019, Martin Tower, Bethlehem Steel's former corporate headquarters building in West Bethlehem, was demolished.

Bethlehem Steel's corporate records are housed at the Hagley Museum and Library in Wilmington, Delaware and at the National Museum of Industrial History in Bethlehem.

Shipyards

Electric multiple units
In 1931 and 1932, Bethlehem Steel manufactured 38 electric multiple unit carriages for the Reading Company.

Freight cars
From 1923 to 1991, Bethlehem Steel was one of the world's leading producers of railroad freight cars following their purchase of Midvale Steel, whose railcar division was located in Johnstown, Pennsylvania. Bethlehem Steel Freight Car Division pioneered the use of aluminum in freight car construction. The Johnstown plant was purchased from Bethlehem Steel through a management buyout in 1991, creating Johnstown America Industries.

Influence on American landmarks 

Bethlehem Steel manufactured the steel for many of the country's most prominent landmarks:
 Bridges:
 George Washington Bridge
 Golden Gate Bridge
 Peace Bridge
 Verrazano-Narrows Bridge; Staten Island tower.
 Buildings:
 Alcatraz Island
 Empire State Building 
 Madison Square Garden
 Merchandise Mart
 One Chase Manhattan Plaza 53,000-ton steel frame.
 Rockefeller Center
 Waldorf Astoria hotel
 Dams:
 Bonneville Dam
 Grand Coulee Dam
 Hoover Dam
 Railways:
 San Francisco Municipal Railway

Bethlehem Steel fabricated the largest electric generator shaft in the world, produced for General Electric in the 1950s, and the steel used for the Wonder Wheel in Coney Island.

In popular culture

Music
In 2012, Bethlehem Steel, a three-piece indie rock band, named itself after the company to honor its legacy.
Also in 2012, the song "Bethlehem Steel" by Nanci Griffith, one of the tracks on her album Intersection, mourned the company's closure.
In 1982, Billy Joel released "Allentown," a song depicting the lives of steelworkers in the twin cities of Allentown and Bethlehem, Pennsylvania. "The subject of the song is the demise of the manufacturing industry in the United States. With the closing of Bethlehem Steel a generation of people were left jobless and depressed, wanting to leave but still clinging to the glory their parents were able to achieve."
In 1996, Grant Lee Buffalo released the song "Bethlehem Steel”, off the album Copperopolis (album). It referenced the eponymous steel company in its lyrics.

Sports
Bethlehem Steel F.C. (1907–1930), sponsored by the Bethlehem Steel corporation, was one of the most successful early American soccer clubs.
Philadelphia Union II is an American professional soccer team that is the official affiliate of the Philadelphia Union of Major League Soccer. The club was founded and formerly based in Bethlehem, where it was known as Bethlehem Steel FC in honor of the original club.
In February 2013, the Philadelphia Union of Major League Soccer unveiled a third uniform that honors and harks back to the original Bethlehem Steel F.C. The kit is primarily black with white trim and features a sublimated Union emblem and a Bethlehem Steel FC jock tag.

Gallery

See also

 List of steel producers
 Alfred Hunt
 Allentown (song)
 Asa Packer
 Charles M. Schwab
 Eugene Grace
 Henry Noll
 Joseph Wharton
 Lackawanna Steel Company
 List of preserved historic blast furnaces
 Martin Tower

References

Notes

Bibliography 
 Hall, P. J. (1915). "History of South Bethlehem, Pa." Semi-centennial, the borough of South Bethlehem, Pennsylvania, 1865–1915. Quinlan Printing Co. pp. 12–13.

Further reading
 Warren, Kenneth. Bethlehem Steel: Builder and Arsenal of America. Pittsburgh, Pa.: University of Pittsburgh Press, 2008.

External links
 
 Beyond Steel: An Archive of Lehigh Valley Industry and Culture
 Bethlehem Steel Corporation and Bethlehem Ship Corporation photograph collection  at Hagley Museum and Library
 Photos of the abandoned plant in Bethlehem Pennsylvania
 Corporate website (Internet Archive snapshot from 2000-12-03)

 
Steel companies of the United States
Ironworks and steel mills in Pennsylvania
Companies based in Bethlehem, Pennsylvania
Industrial buildings and structures in Pennsylvania
American companies established in 1857
Manufacturing companies established in 1857
Manufacturing companies disestablished in 2003
1857 establishments in Pennsylvania
2003 disestablishments in Pennsylvania
Former components of the Dow Jones Industrial Average
ArcelorMittal
Companies that filed for Chapter 11 bankruptcy in 2001
Sparrows Point, Maryland
Economic history of Pennsylvania
Defunct manufacturing companies based in Pennsylvania
History of Northampton County, Pennsylvania